William Moseley (born November 11, 1951) is an American actor, primarily known for his performances in horror films. His best-known roles include Chop Top in The Texas Chainsaw Massacre 2 (1986), Otis B. Driftwood in Rob Zombie's Firefly trilogy, Luigi Largo in Repo! The Genetic Opera (2008), and The Magician in Alleluia! The Devil's Carnival (2015). He had a recurring role as camp cook Possum on the HBO TV series Carnivàle (2003–05). He has also released records with guitarist Buckethead in the band Cornbugs, as well as featuring on the guitarist's solo work.

Early life 
Moseley was born in Stamford, Connecticut, and grew up in Barrington Hills, Illinois. He is the son of Virginia Gillette (Kleitz), a journalist, and S. D. Moseley (Spencer Dumaresq Moseley), who was a member of the Yale Corporation, All-American captain and center of the 1942 Yale football team, and chairman and chief executive of the Railway Express Agency. His grandfather, George Moseley, also played football at Yale and was an All-American. He is a graduate of Yale University.

For a period of time, Moseley operated as a journalist, writing for such magazines as Omni, National Lampoon and Psychology Today.

Acting career 
At the age of 29, Moseley got his first film role in Alan Rudolph's Endangered Species as a cab driver. In 1985's Osa he played a character named "Quilt Face." His third role has become one of his most well known; he appeared as Chop Top in Tobe Hooper's The Texas Chainsaw Massacre 2, after Tobe Hooper saw him in the independent short, The Texas Chainsaw Manicure. In 2000 he reprised his role as Chop Top in All American Massacre, which was directed by Tobe Hooper's son William, but the film was never released to the public.

Two years after TCM 2, he played Frank in 1988's Mamba. Also in 1988 appeared as a soldier in the remake of the Steve McQueen film The Blob. He next played Darrell in the film Pink Cadillac starring Clint Eastwood. He then played the lead role of Ricky Caldwell in Silent Night, Deadly Night 3: Better Watch Out!.

In 1990, Moseley appeared in four films: Crash and Burn, The First Power, The End of Innocence, and, playing Johnny, in Tom Savini's remake of George A. Romero's 1968 zombie film, Night of the Living Dead. In 1993, he had a small role in the cult hit Army of Darkness as the Deadite Captain. A year later, he was featured in the video game Corpse Killer. In 1995, he did voiceover work for Anders Jacobsson's horror comedy film Evil Ed.

He would not, however, have another role as popular as Chop Top until 2003, when he starred as the maniacal Otis B. Driftwood (named after Groucho Marx's character from A Night at the Opera) in Rob Zombie's directorial debut House of 1000 Corpses. As Otis, he again became an icon in the horror community. In 2005, he reprised the role of Otis in the sequel The Devil's Rejects and in 2009 he played Otis in a voice cameo in Rob Zombie's animated film The Haunted World of El Superbeasto. Moseley's performance in Rejects inspired an independent campaign for a Best Supporting Actor Oscar nomination, which failed. He played in other Rob Zombie films such as Halloween and the Grindhouse fake trailer segment Werewolf Women of the SS.

In 2008, Moseley played the role of Luigi Largo in Repo! The Genetic Opera. In this futuristic, genetic opera, he was able to network with Nivek Ogre of Skinny Puppy and ohGr, subsequently appearing on ohGr's new album Devils in my Details. He mainly speaks at the beginning or ending of the songs in vivid, poetic rants.  He appears on Eyecandy, Feelin' Chicken, Psychoreal, Timebomb, Smogharp, and Witness. Additionally, in 2008, Moseley appeared as a telemarketer in the music video for Combichrist's Sent to Destroy".

Moseley contributed songs to the 2008 soundtrack of Vampira: The Movie, a documentary by Kevin Sean Michaels on Maila Nurmi, in which he also stars. It was released on Collectables Records, a division of Alpha Video.

He appears as Kozlowski in Robert Lieberman's 2009 thriller film The Tortured, and in 2012 played as The Magician in The Devil's Carnival.

Moseley has also provided voice-over recordings for the Florida-based heavy metal band – Generichrist and also British goth-metal band Sinnergod on the track "Overture" which features on their 2013 debut album Seven Deadly Sinphonies.

He later made appearances in Texas Chainsaw 3D and American Exorcist.

In 2019, Moseley appeared in Gothic Harvest with Lin Shaye and Sofia Mattsson, directed by Ashley Hamilton. He also reprised his role as Otis B. Driftwood in 3 From Hell. Horror Fuel magazine reports that Moseley will star in the horror film Jasper alongside Michael Berryman, Kane Hodder and Bill Oberst in 2022.

He recorded voiceovers for Ice Nine Kills' 2021 horror film-themed album The Silver Scream 2: Welcome to Horrorwood.

Music career 
Moseley (as Chop Top) was the lead singer of Cornbugs, a three-man band he had between 1999 and 2007 with avant-garde rock/metal guitarist Buckethead and Deli Creeps' drummer, Pinchface. He also contributed vocal parts to the songs I Come in Peace (as a news reporter) and Onions Unleashed (as Onions) from Buckethead's album Giant Robot (1994) and Jowls from Buckethead's album Monsters and Robots (1999), also as Chop Top.

Moseley, along with Rani Sharone, released the album No Way Down, calling themselves Spider Mountain.

Personal life 
Moseley is married to actress Lucinda Jenney.  He previously dated model Lisa Lindsay-Hogg.  Moseley and Lindsay-Hogg have two daughters: Marion Moseley, an actress, and Jane Moseley, a model, painter and sculptor based in Los Angeles.

In popular culture 

A sample of Moseley shouting "dog will hunt!" in The Texas Chainsaw Massacre 2 is used in the hit Primus song "Jerry Was a Race Car Driver".

Filmography

Film

Television

Music videos

References

External links 

Chop Top's BBQ, Bill Moseley's official site
Vampira: The Movie soundtrack featuring Bill Moseley

 Interview with Bill Moseley at Eye for Film

1951 births
Living people
Male actors from Illinois
American male film actors
American male television actors
Male actors from Stamford, Connecticut
Yale University alumni
People from Barrington Hills, Illinois
Cornbugs members